The Men's 4x100 metres relay event at the 2011 European Athletics U23 Championships was held in Ostrava, Czech Republic, at Městský stadion on 17 July.

Medalists

†: Competed only in heat.

Results

Final
17 July 2011 / 17:25

Heats
Qualified: First 3 in each heat (Q) and 2 best performers (q) advance to the Final

Summary

Details

Heat 1
17 July 2011 / 15:45

Heat 2
17 July 2011 / 15:52

Participation
According to an unofficial count, 41 athletes from 10 countries participated in the event.

References

4 x 100 metres relay
Relays at the European Athletics U23 Championships